The Frelinghuysen Morris House and Studio is a historic house museum and former art studio in Lenox and Stockbridge, Massachusetts.  The house and studio were home to American Abstract Artists George L.K. Morris and Suzy Frelinghuysen. The studio was built in Bauhaus style in 1930 by Morris and his friend George Sanderson. The house was added in 1941, designed by John Butler Swann. The house and studio were entered onto the National Register of Historic Places in 2016.

The house contains furnishings and decorations unchanged since the couple's lifetime. The art collection includes cubist frescoes and paintings by Morris and Frelinghuysen, as well as works by Pablo Picasso, Juan Gris, Georges Braque, Joan Miró and Henri Matisse.

Property history
The property was part of a larger agricultural property until 1885, when it was developed as a country estate called Brookhurst by William Bainbridge Shattuck of New York City.  Shattuck hired architect James Renwick Jr., whose well-known commissions include the Smithsonian Castle in Washington, D.C.  The main house burned down in 1908, leaving only a number of Renwick-designed outbuildings.  The estate was then purchased by Newbold Morris (the son of Augustus Newbold Morris), who hired Francis L. V. Hoppin and Terence Koen (who had also done work on Edith Wharton's The Mount) to design a grand Colonial Revival mansion house.  One of the outbuildings from this period was converted into a guesthouse by Frelinghuysen and Morris.

Upon the death of Helen Morris in 1956, the estate was divided into three portions.  The westernmost element, which includes some of the Brookhurst outbuildings, was inherited by George Morris.  He had hired George Sanderson, a college classmate, to design the Modernist studio which was completed in 1930, taking inspiration from the groundbreaking work of Le Corbusier.  The studio is one of the oldest Modernist buildings in the state.  The house was added in 1941, after Morris and Frelinghuysen married, as an adjunct to the studio space, and is considered an early example of Mid-Century Modern architecture.  Morris died in 1975, and Frelinghuysen in 1988.  After her death, a non-profit foundation was established to preserve the property as a museum.

See also
 National Register of Historic Places listings in Berkshire County, Massachusetts
 Historic Artists' Homes and Studios

References

External links 
Official website

Frelinghuysen family residences
Buildings and structures in Lenox, Massachusetts
Museums in Stockbridge, Massachusetts
Museums in Lenox, Massachusetts
Art museums and galleries in Massachusetts
Historic house museums in Massachusetts
Modern art museums in the United States
Artists' studios in the United States
Frelinghuysen family
Buildings and structures completed in 1930
Modernist architecture in Massachusetts
Houses completed in 1941
Biographical museums in Massachusetts
Houses on the National Register of Historic Places in Berkshire County, Massachusetts
Commercial buildings on the National Register of Historic Places in Massachusetts
1930 establishments in Massachusetts